Ambrose Roy Hord Jr. (December 25, 1934October 24, 2002) was a professional American football offensive lineman who played in the National Football League (NFL) and the American Football League (AFL).

Early years
Hord was born in Charlotte, North Carolina and attended the local Harding High School. He played college football at Duke University where he was a defensive end and an offensive guard. He was named first-team All-American in 1957 and was inducted into Duke's Hall of Fame in 2005.

Professional career
Hord was an 8th round selection (88th overall pick) of the 1957 NFL Draft by the Los Angeles Rams. Before he joins the Rams, Hord served for two years (1958–1959) in the United States Army, training at Bitburg Air Force Base in Germany. He joined the Rams in 1960 and played with them through the beginning of the 1962 season when he was traded to the Philadelphia Eagles. He then joined the AFL's New York Jets in 1963 where he finished his football career in 1965.

After football
After his NFL career ended in 1965, he became general manager of Riverside International Raceway which he worked alongside former Rams player Les Richter. The raceway closed 6 years after he left in 1983, when he became a legislative aide to Riverside County Supervisor Norton Younglove. Hord also served as a legislative aide to Riverside County Supervisor Tom Mullen until the December before his death.

References

External links
Stats
New York Jets page

1934 births
2002 deaths
Players of American football from Charlotte, North Carolina
American football offensive guards
Duke Blue Devils football players
United States Army soldiers
Los Angeles Rams players
Philadelphia Eagles players
New York Jets players
Deaths from cancer
American Football League players